Arizona has the twenty-ninth highest per capita income in the United States of America, at $20,275 (2000). Its personal per capita income is $26,838 (2003).

Arizona counties ranked by per capita income

Note: Data is from the 2010 United States Census Data and the 2006–2010 American Community Survey 5-Year Estimates.

References

Economy of Arizona
Arizona
Income